Bosman Stadium is a multi-use stadium in Brakpan, South Africa. The Falcons Currie Cup team has historically used this ground as their home base. The stadium is currently used for football and rugby matches.

In October 2015, the Stadium made history as it was announced that it would host two 2017 Rugby League World Cup qualifiers between home team South Africa and Middle Eastern country Lebanon in a quest to determine which team, will qualify for the 2017 Rugby League World Cup.

See also 

 List of stadiums in South Africa
 List of African stadiums by capacity

References

Multi-purpose stadiums in South Africa
Sports venues in Gauteng
Rugby league stadiums
Brakpan